Taden (Gallo: Taden) is a commune in the Côtes-d'Armor department of Brittany in northwestern France.

Population

Inhabitants of Taden are called Tadennais in French.

See also
Communes of the Côtes-d'Armor department

References

External links

Official website 

Communes of Côtes-d'Armor